Heavenly Shift is a 2013 Hungarian dark comedy film by Márk Bodzsár, in his directorial debut.

Synopsis
Milán, a young refugee from the Yugoslav Wars, escapes to Hungary in 1992, leaving his Bosnian bride behind. By chance, he meets Fék and Tamás, two paramedics who are making money on the side by selling identities of the dead people they transport. They recruit Milán, who uses the money to try to bring his fiancée, Tánya, out of the disintegrating Yugoslavia.

Cast and characters
 András Ötvös as Milán
 Roland Rába as Fék
 Keresztes Tamás as Tamás
 Natasa Stork as Tánya
 Sándor Zsótér as Vinnai
 Géza D. Hegedüs as Dr. Oppenheim
 Hanna Pálos as Terike
 Zsolt Trill as Szőke Kóla

References

External links
 

2013 comedy films
2013 films
2010s Hungarian-language films
Hungarian comedy films